Mount Lysaght is a peak,  high, standing  north of Mount Markham in the northern part of the Queen Elizabeth Range, Antarctica. It was discovered and named by the British Antarctic Expedition, 1907–09.

References

Mountains of the Ross Dependency
Shackleton Coast